The Internet is an American alternative R&B band from Los Angeles, California. It consists of vocalist Syd, keyboardist Matt Martians, bassist Patrick Paige II, drummer Christopher Smith, and guitarist Steve Lacy.

Their music is a blend of R&B, hip-hop, jazz, funk, and electronic dance music. They have released four studio albums and three extended plays since their formation in late 2011. The band's 2015 album Ego Death was nominated for the Grammy Award for Best Urban Contemporary Album.

History 
The Internet was formed in early 2011 by Odd Future members Syd and Matt Martians, along with touring members Patrick Paige, Christopher Smith, and Tay Walker. The band's name originally started out as a joke, inspired by Left Brain's answer to a reporter asking where he was from, to which he responded, "I hate when people ask me that, I'm going to start saying I'm from the Internet". The idea amused Syd, and inspired the name for her side project that eventually became The Internet.

Their debut album Purple Naked Ladies was released on December 20, 2011. It was the first physical album to be released through Odd Future Records. Two songs from the album, "Cocaine" and "Fastlane", had music videos to accompany their release. The Internet has a song included on the Odd Future album The OF Tape Vol. 2, called "Ya know".

The band released their second album Feel Good in September 2013, and received praise from fans and critics. The first single from the album, "Give It Time", was released through Odd Future's official SoundCloud. On June 10, 2013, The band backed Mac Miller in London in promotion of his second album Watching Movies with the Sound Off.

Their third album Ego Death was released by Odd Future & Columbia on June 30, 2015 to widespread acclaim. Matt Martians on NPR said about the album's title: "A lot of people that we know [are] just having their egos checked in many ways. Some people losing their jobs when, last year, they were at the top of the mountain; certain people's careers going in different directions that they didn't anticipate. And just kind of two words that you want people to think about these days, because we do have a lot of people who, on the Internet — whether it's Instagram, Twitter — it's a lot of egos that are really based on nothing backing it up."

Following the release of Ego Death, the band's members each focused on releasing individual solo projects. 2017 saw the release of Matt Martians' The Drum Chord Theory, Syd's Fin, Steve Lacy's Demo, Patrick Paige II's Letters of Irrelevance and Christopher A. Smith's Loud, as a part of the duo C&T.

In December 2017, Steve Lacy told DJ Matt Wilkinson of Beats 1 that the follow-up to Ego Death was "95%" finished. He added: "I feel like this is on a higher echelon than Ego Death. I love Ego Death, that was a great record, but I know this one is a step up."

In April 2018, Patrick Paige II announced his debut album Letters of Irrelevance. Later that month, the band released the single "Roll (Burbank Funk)", in promotion of their fourth studio album, Hive Mind. The track features joint lead vocals by Steve Lacy and Syd. The next month the band announced their fourth album, Hive Mind, which released on July 20, 2018. In October 2018, The Internet was the opening act at all but one show for Gorillaz on their North American leg of The Now Now Tour, which concluded with the Demon Dayz Festival. Their performance at the Scotiabank Arena on October 8, 2018 was their first ever performance in a stadium venue.

Discography

Studio albums

EPs

Singles

Other appearances

Members
Contributions refer to members' live roles. On studio recordings, each member plays a variety of instruments.

 Sydney Bennett – vocals 
 Steve Lacy – guitar, vocals 
 Matthew Martin – keyboards, vocals 
 Patrick Paige II – bass guitar 
 Christopher Smith – drums

Past members
 Tay Walker – keyboards 
 Jameel Bruner – keyboards

Awards and nominations

Soul Train Awards

Grammy Awards

References 

Musical groups established in 2011
American musical duos
Hip hop duos
Hip hop groups from California
American contemporary R&B musical groups
American soul musical groups
Trip hop groups
Musical groups from Los Angeles
African-American musical groups
Feminist musicians
Columbia Records artists
2011 establishments in California